Taryn Kate Potts (née Mallett) (born 19 April 1992) is a field hockey player from South Africa. In 2020, she was an athlete at the Summer Olympics.

Career

Under–21
In 2013, Potts made her debut for the South Africa U–21 team at the FIH Junior World Cup in Mönchengladbach.

National team
Potts made her senior international debut for South Africa in 2020, during a test series against Ireland in Stellenbosch.

Despite only making five appearances for the national team, Potts was named to the South Africa squad for the 2020 Summer Olympics in Tokyo. She will make her Olympic debut on 24 July 2021, in the Pool A match against Ireland.

References

External links

1992 births
Living people
Female field hockey defenders
South African female field hockey players
People from Stellenbosch
Field hockey players at the 2020 Summer Olympics
Olympic field hockey players of South Africa
Sportspeople from the Western Cape